Rosebud was a provincial electoral district in Alberta, Canada, mandated to return a single member to the Legislative Assembly of Alberta from 1905 to 1909.

History
The Rosebud electoral district was one of the original 25 electoral districts contested in the 1905 Alberta general election upon Alberta joining Confederation in September 1905.

The riding was short-lived, however, as it disappeared in 1909 when it was split to form the ridings of Cochrane and Didsbury as well as the north part of Rocky Mountain.

Cornelius Hiebert was elected to the Legislative Assembly of Alberta in the 1905 general election defeating Liberal and future Member of Parliament Michael Clark in a hotly contested three way race. He was just one of two Conservatives elected to serve in the official opposition that year. Hiebert became the first Mennonite elected to the Alberta Legislature.

Election results

1905 general election
The returning officer for the 1905 election in Rosebud was Herbert B. Adshead.

See also
List of Alberta provincial electoral districts

References

Further reading

External links
Elections Alberta
The Legislative Assembly of Alberta

Former provincial electoral districts of Alberta